Colonel Lemuel Mason (born c. 1628) was an early American politician, justice, and militia colonel. He was a member of the House of Burgesses multiple times.

Biography
Mason was born around 1628 in Virginia to Lieutenant Francis Mason and his second wife Alice. 

Mason was a member of the House of Burgesses in 1654, 1657-1660, 1663, 1666, 1675, 1685, and 1692. Additionally, he held other political posts, including Justice of Lower Norfolk County from 1650-1702, colonel of the militia in 1680, and Presiding Justice.

Family
He was married to Anne Seawald/Seawell, daughter of Henry Seawald/Seawell of Sewell's Point. Together they had children:
 Elizabeth Mason, who married (first) William Major, and (second) Captain Thomas Cocke
 Lemuel Mason, living in 1705
 George Mason, who married Phillis. They had children Thomas Mason, who married Mary Newton; George Mason; Abigail Mason; and Frances Mason
 Thomas Mason, who became a Burgess in October 1696. He married Elizabeth. They had children Lemuel Mason (no issue); Ann Mason, who married Captain Thomas Willoughby; Mary Mason, who married William Ellison; and Margaret Mason
 Frances Mason, who married (first) George Newton, and (second) Mr. Sayer
 Alice Mason, who married (first) Robert Hodge, and (second) Samuel Boush
 Mary Mason, who married (first) Mr. Walton, and (second) Mr. Cocke
 Dinah Mason, who married Mr. Thoroughgood
 Margaret Mason
 Anne Mason, who married William Kendall II, son of William Kendall

Mason's will was dated June 17, 1695 and was proved September 15, 1702.

References

House of Burgesses members
1702 deaths